Andy Kuntz (born 20 November 1962) is a German progressive metal singer best known for his work with the band Vanden Plas. He has also participated in a production of the musical Jesus Christ Superstar.

Background
Kuntz was born in Kaiserslautern, Germany. Since age 14, he has been interested in singing and he always wanted to be a "big rock star". When he was a teenager, he was in a garage punk rock band called Rock Zock. He has said his main influences are Kansas, Thin Lizzy, Van Halen, Genesis, Magnum, and Sting. Kuntz is a first cousin of former German national association football player Stefan Kuntz.

Formation of Vanden Plas
When Kuntz was in school, drummer Andreas Lill heard Kuntz singing in his punk band, Rock Zock. Kuntz didn't like the kind of music that Rock Zock was playing, and Lill asked him to sing for his band, which was called Exodus at the time. When the question of a new name came up, they were inspired by a car maker they saw (Vanden Plas), and they thought that it would be an interesting band name.

Discography

With Vanden Plas
Colour Temple (1994)
AcCult (1996, acoustic EP)
The God Thing (1997)
Far Off Grace (1999)
Spirit of Live (2000, live album)
Beyond Daylight (2002)
Christ 0 (2006)
The Seraphic Clockwork (2010)
The Chronicles of the Immortals: Netherworld (Path I) (2014)
The Chronicles of the Immortals: Netherworld (Path II) (2015)

With Abydos
Abydos: The Little Boy's Heavy Mental Shadow Opera About the Inhabitants of His Diary (2004)

With Missa Mercuria
Missa Mercuria (2002)

With All My Shadows
’’Eerie Monsters’’ (2023)

References

External links
Vanden Plas official website

German heavy metal singers
German male singers
Living people
1962 births
People from Kaiserslautern